The Ebro Basin was a foreland basin that formed to the south of the Pyrenees during the Paleogene. It was also limited to the southeast by the Catalan Coastal Ranges. It began as a fully marine basin with connections to both the Atlantic Ocean and the Mediterranean Sea, before becoming an endorheic basin during the Late Eocene. In the Miocene the basin was captured by a precursor to the Ebro river and the new drainage system that developed eroded away much of the basin fill, except for resistant lithologies, such as the conglomerates at Montserrat.

References

Foreland basins
Geology of Spain
Geology of Catalonia